Who is Hussain? is a non-profit organisation which promotes awareness about the life and legacy of Hussain ibn Ali and works to constructively serve humanity, primarily through blood donations and shelter provisions. An organisation founded in 2012 by a group from London, England, Who is Hussain seeks to "[let] the world know about an inspirational man who lived fourteen-hundred years ago." Primarily through public advertising, including tube posters on the London Underground, billboards in prominent urban areas and leaflet hand-outs, volunteers refer members of the public to the organisation's website. The organisation's stated vision is "to see a world inspired by the unique personality of Hussain: his actions and his compassion for those around him."

Hussain ibn Ali

Hussain, son of Ali and Fatimah and the grandson of the Islamic Prophet Muhammad, lived 1400 years ago in Arabia, and is recognized as an important figure in Islam, as he was a member of the Ahl al-Bayt (the household of Prophet Muhammad) and Ahl al-Kisa, as well as being the third Shia Imam. He is most well known for his principled stance against oppression and his eventual martyrdom in the battle of Karbala, 61 A.H./680 AD, in which Hussain and his companions fought the caliph Yazid and his army of circa 30,000. Who is Hussain cites this battle as epitomising Hussain's greatest qualities, saying that while Hussain had little or no hope of victory for himself, it was hoped the stand would shake the nation's conscience to battle the injustice and immorality Hussain felt present in Arabia. According to Who is Hussain the battle of Karbala laid the foundations for the overthrow of the Caliph's dynasty.

The organisation also seek to highlight other stories of Hussain's life to promote compassion, honour and integrity. For example, "a celebrated example was when he and his brother Hassan cared tirelessly for a poor blind man they came upon in their city, in spite of traditional social expectations.

Water and event of Karbala
During the battle of Karbala, Yazid's army laid siege to Hussain's camp and forbade them access to water from the nearby river Euphrates.  This is why drinking water is provided to the needy in memoriam of their martyrdom. The organization donated 30,000 bottles of water to the Red Cross in Flint Michigan during the water contamination crisis in early 2016. A similar move was also arranged in India at local level with the motivation that Hussain stands as a timeless example for all irrespective of their faith or color  Repeating the tradition of water supply, team of volunteers to introduce their campaign distributed the bottles of water tagged with information about Hussain Ibn Ali in Seattle, Washington, US.

Website 
whoishussain.org

Who is Hussain's website is the group's main platform for sharing the message of Hussain ibn Ali, which explains the full story of Hussain's life, details of how to get involved in promoting the campaign, famous quotes of Hussain, merchandise and how to request an information pack.

Upon launch in 2012, the website was widely shared on Facebook and Twitter. Since its launch in December 2012, the website has had over 100,000 unique hits from over 30 countries.

Global presence 

Over time the organisation began to gain international recognition. In 2013, Who is Hussain began to accumulate global representatives. These representatives are local ambassadors for the organisation with a twofold purpose: (i) the organisation of local advertising promoting Who is Hussain and in particular its website and (ii) putting on goodwill and charitable events in honour of and 'inspired by' Hussain ibn Ali. Examples of these initiatives include blood donation drives, initiating food collections for the homeless and winter coat collections for the elderly.

As at December 2014, Who is Hussain had 68 representatives in cities across the globe. Each representative liaises with the central London team on a periodic basis. Representatives span cities in five continents including Chicago, Ottawa, Sydney, Adelaide, Birmingham, Karachi, Stockholm, Cape Town and Christchurch.

#TeamGiveBack 

In November 2014, Who is Hussain launched a campaign entitled '#TeamGiveBack'. The aim of the campaign was to engage with the public on social media to identify how Hussain ibn Ali inspired them. The public was invited to donate to Iraq Relief Fund (Iraq being the site of Hussain's shrine). Who is Hussain encouraged individuals to 'give back' to the community. A variety of events were organised by Who is Hussain global representatives, including the donation of care packages to the homeless and blood donation drives In 2020, Who is Hussain worked with Paani Project to build wells in Pakistan.

See also

Imam Hussain Blood Donation Campaign
Faith-based organization

References

External links
 Who is Hussain Website

English websites
Islamic organisations based in the United Kingdom
Organizations established in 2012
2012 establishments in England